José Manuel Puelles de los Santos (January 16, 1894 – August 5, 1936) was a Spanish physician. He served as president of the Provincial Council of Seville and was killed by the military coup against the Second Spanish Republic.

References

1894 births
1936 deaths
Spanish physicians